François Coudray (born c. 1678 in Villecerf, in the Province of Champagne (now  commune of  Messon in the French departement of Aube) and died April 29, 1727, in Dresden, Duchy of Saxony (now federal state of Saxony, Germany)) is a French sculptor who spent more of his prominent artistic life in Dresden where he was the First sculptor of the King Augustus II the Strong.

References
 Emmanuel Bénézit (consolidated under the direction of Jacques Busse edition), Dictionary sculptors designers and engravers, painters t. 4 (Coudert-Dzwonowski) Gründ, 1999, 957 p., p. 7 "Coudray Francis"

External links
 

18th-century French sculptors
French male sculptors
1678 births
1727 deaths
18th-century French male artists